Kovačevići (Cyrillic: Ковачевићи) may refer to several places:
Kovačevići (Cazin), a village in the municipality of Cazin, Bosnia and Herzegovina
, a village in the municipality of Sapna, Bosnia and Herzegovina
Kovačevići (Donji Vakuf), a village in the municipality of Donji Vakuf, Bosnia and Herzegovina
Kovačevići (Pljevlja), a village in the municipality of Pljevlja, Montenegro

See also
Kovačević, a surname
Kovač (disambiguation)
Kovači (disambiguation)
Kovačić (disambiguation)
Kovačići (disambiguation)
Kovačica (disambiguation)
Kovačice, a village
Kovačina, a village
Kovačevo (disambiguation)
Kovačevac (disambiguation)
Kovačevci (disambiguation)
Kováčová (disambiguation)
Kováčovce, a village